Collette Hope (born 21 December 1980) is a Guyanese former rugby union player and a former footballer who played as a defender. She has been a member of both the Guyana women's national rugby union team and the Guyana women's national football team.

Early life
Hope hails Victoria, Demerara-Mahaica.

International career
Hope capped for Guyana at senior level during the 2010 CONCACAF Women's World Cup Qualifying qualification.

See also
List of Guyana women's international footballers

References

1980 births
Living people
Female rugby union players
Guyanese women's footballers
Guyana women's international footballers
Women's association football defenders
People from Demerara-Mahaica